"Shake" is the lead single on MercyMe's eighth studio album Welcome to the New. On April 22, 2014, MercyMe performed the song on Today with Kathie Lee and Hoda.  The song was nominated for Best Contemporary Christian Music Performance/Song at the 57th Annual Grammy Awards.

Weekly charts

Release and radio history

References 
 

2013 singles
Contemporary Christian songs
2013 songs
Songs written by David Garcia (musician)
Songs written by Ben Glover